The 2016-17 Bulgarian Hockey League season was the 65th season of the Bulgarian Hockey League, the top level of ice hockey in Bulgaria. Five teams participated in the league, and Irbis-Skate Sofia won the championship.

Regular season

External links
 Season on eurohockey.com

Bulgarian Hockey League seasons
Bul